Khodadad Erfani is an ethnic Hazara politician from Afghanistan, who was the representative of the people of Ghazni province in the 16th term of the Afghan Parliament.

Early life 
Khodadad Erfani was born on 1953 in Jaghori district of Ghazni province.

See also 
 List of Hazara people

References 

Living people
1953 births
Hazara politicians
People from Ghazni Province